The James Lynn Cartlidge Forrest County Multipurpose Center is an arena and county fairgrounds located in Hattiesburg, Mississippi.  It consists of many buildings including:

--A  main arena with 37,800 square feet (140' by 270') of arena floor space.  It contains 2,586 permanent seats.  The arena floor can hold between 3,000 and 4,000 seats; seating capacity is up to 6,586.  The climate-controlled arena contains two concession stands, four spotlights, two dressing rooms as well as a 60-by-40-foot portable stage, a state-of-the-art sound system and enough space for 200 vendor booths.  It has a clay/loam/sand floor.  It is used for sporting events, concerts, trade shows, meetings and other special events.

--A covered warm-up arena with 18,750 square feet (125' by 150') of arena floor space, bleacher seating for 300, and an announcer's stand.

--Two Equine Stall Buildings—Barn C with 19,200 square feet (100' by 192') of space and Barn D with 18,500 square feet(100' by 185') of space.  Both are used for animal storage and sales, among other events.

--The Extension Conference Center, built in 2002 and featuring  of space and capacity of up to 300 for smaller meetings, weddings, banquets and other special events.

Also located at the Center are an RV Park, Forrest County Lake, and a sheep and swine barn.

In 2021 it became home to the Mississippi Raiders of the American Arena League.

External links
Forrest County Multipurpose Center

Convention centers in Mississippi
Indoor arenas in Mississippi
Buildings and structures in Hattiesburg, Mississippi
Tourist attractions in Forrest County, Mississippi